The  Santa Fe College Kika Silva Pla Planetarium is a 34-foot in diameter, domed theater in Gainesville, Florida. The planetarium seats 60 people and uses two projection systems. An In-Space-System (ISS) 1C-3K digital projection system by RSA Cosmos and an optical-mechanical Chronos Space Simulator manufactured by Goto.

History 
The planetarium was dedicated in September 2006 and officially opened to the public in September 2007 and is located on the Northwest Campus of Santa Fe College. The SF Kika Silva Pla Planetarium was made possible by a donation of John Pla and his wife Amy Howard, on behalf of the Pla family, in recognition of his mother, Kika Silva Pla's, commitment to education and passion for social justice and civic engagement. The planetarium was funded with additional support from a special federal appropriation arranged by Congressman Cliff Stearns.

Laurent Pellerin was the planetarium's first coordinator. James C. Albury became the planetarium coordinator in October 2009, and was a co-host on the internationally syndicated PBS show "Star Gazer".

See also 
 Buehler Planetarium and Observatory
List of planetariums
Amateur astronomy

References 

Buildings and structures in Gainesville, Florida
Planetaria in the United States
Tourist attractions in Gainesville, Florida
Education in Gainesville, Florida
2006 establishments in Florida